Sir Robert Dowling (born 1940) is a British schoolteacher and headmaster in the city of Birmingham, England.

He is known for turning around the George Dixon Academy from closing, and was made a Knight Bachelor in the 2002 Birthday Honours, "For services to Special Needs Education". 

In 2005, he was praised by OFSTED for his role in dealing with issues of sex and morality in his school.

He was  Headmaster of St George's School, Edgbaston, Birmingham, subsequently becoming Chairman of the school's board of trustees.

References 

Living people
1940 births
Heads of schools in England
People from Birmingham, West Midlands
Knights Bachelor
20th-century English educators
21st-century English educators
Place of birth missing (living people)